The 2021 Uruguayan Liga Metropolitana Amateur season, officially known as the Campeonato Uruguayo 2021 de la Divisional D, was the inaugural season of the Uruguayan Liga Metropolitana Amateur, bringing back the tier to the Uruguayan football league system after 43 seasons without a fourth division. An experimental league, it began on December 3, 2021 and ended on December 17, 2021; lasting only two weeks.

Cooper ended up as champions after beating Paso de la Arena 4–0 to seal their first "Divisional D" and second historical fourth division title (they had previously won a Primera "D" title in 1976).

Teams 
As it was its inaugural season, all teams were newcomers to the league. Though most of these teams were founded or affiliated with the Uruguayan Football Association with the sole purpose of competing in the league, it marked the return of Cooper (and disputably Deutscher) to the Uruguayan football league.

The teams that participated in the league's first season were:

Special considerations:

 1.C. S. y D. Hacele un Gol a la Vida is actually based on the city of Young, in the Río Negro department. However, and solely with the purpose of taking part in the league, the club has moved its administrative venues to the city of Montevideo.
 2.Though it bears the same name, colours and crest of the original Deutscher F. K., the original club had briefly changed name to Centro Atlético Montevideo before being dissolved in 1909.

The teams were divided into two groups or Series (labeled "A" and "B") of four teams each, which were randomly sorted before the season began. Teams would only face teams within their same series in a single-round format, meaning that only three matches would be played within each group. Then, after all matches in both series had been played, a one-round final would be held between the teams topping their groups to determine the 2021 Uruguayan Liga Metropolitana Amateur champion.

Standings

Serie A 
The Serie A was named William "Tola" Ferreira and included C. S. y D. Paso de la Arena, C. A. Cinco Esquinas de Pando, Deutscher Fussball Klub and C. S. y D. Keguay:

Serie B 
The Serie B was given the name of Luis "Gallego" Villar and included C. S. y D. Cooper, Rincón de Carrasco B. F. C., C. A. Unión de San José and C. S. y D. Hacele un Gol a la Vida:

Footnote:

 C. A. Unión de San José fielded unregistered players, thus the entirety of the points of its 2–2 draw against Rincón de Carrasco B. F. C. were granted to the latter and the match counted as a win.

Championship Playoff

See also 

 Uruguayan football league system
 Uruguayan Liga Metropolitana Amateur
 Copa Uruguay

References

External links 

 Division's Official Historical Record
Amateur sports